Jon Brion (born December 11, 1963) is an American singer, songwriter, multi-instrumentalist, record producer, and composer. He performed with the Excerpts, the Bats, 'Til Tuesday and the Grays before becoming an established producer and film score composer. 

Brion has produced music for artists and bands including Of Montreal, Aimee Mann, Love Jones, Eels, Fiona Apple, Elliott Smith, Robyn Hitchcock, Rhett Miller, The Crystal Method, Kanye West, Sky Ferreira and Mac Miller. According to Stereogum, Brion's work on Mann's first solo albums "lay the groundwork for a sound that became synonymous with a strain of notable alternative acts at the turn of the century".

Brion's film scores include  Hard Eight (1996), Magnolia (1999), Punch-Drunk Love (2002), Eternal Sunshine of the Spotless Mind and I Heart Huckabees (both 2004), Synecdoche, New York (2008), ParaNorman (2012), Lady Bird (2017), and Christopher Robin (2018). He released his debut solo album, Meaningless, in 2001.

Early life
Brion was born in Glen Ridge, New Jersey on December 11, 1963. He comes from a musical family; his mother, LaRue, was an administrative assistant and singer, and his father, Keith Brion, was a band director at Yale. His brother and sister became a composer/arranger and a violinist, respectively. Brion grew up in Connecticut, where he dropped out of Hamden High School at the age of 17, opting instead to play music professionally. From 1980–85 Jon was part of the band The Excerpts, along with Stephen Harris, Dean Falcone, Jim Balga, Bobby Butcher & Spike Priggen.

Career

The Bats
In the early 1980s, Brion and musician/producer Bill Murphy began a writing collaboration in New Haven, Connecticut. They eventually enlisted bassist Don "Riff" Fertman and together formed the Bats (not to be confused with the New Zealand group or South African group of the same name). The Bats released a single, "Popgun", and one album, How Pop Can You Get?, on Gustav Records in 1982. The recordings had much critical acclaim, but little commercial success, and the trio eventually disbanded.

Session work
In 1987, Brion moved to Boston, where he played solo gigs, formed the short-lived band World's Fair and became a member of the last touring version of Aimee Mann's new wave band 'Til Tuesday. He contributed guitar work to Jellyfish's 1993 album Spilt Milk, and in 1994, joined Dan McCarroll, Buddy Judge and ex-Jellyfish guitarist Jason Falkner in the short-lived pop band the Grays. He also played guitar on the Wallflowers' hit song "One Headlight", using a screwdriver that was sitting atop a nearby amp as a slide. Brion played numerous instruments on Sam Phillips' 1996 release Omnipop. Brion is featured as keyboardist and drummer on Marianne Faithfull's 2003 album, Kissin Time, and co-wrote a song, "City of Quartz", for her next work, 2005's Before the Poison.

Production
After being recognized as an accomplished session player, Brion branched out into production on then-girlfriend Mann's 1993 solo debut, Whatever, and its follow-up, I'm With Stupid. He has also produced albums by Fiona Apple, Rufus Wainwright, Eleni Mandell, Rhett Miller, Robyn Hitchcock, Brad Mehldau and Evan Dando, and co-produced Kanye West's Late Registration in 2005.

In the fall of 2002, Brion began producing the album Extraordinary Machine with Fiona Apple, but she later brought in producers Mike Elizondo and Brian Kehew (a friend of Brion's) to complete the album. Brion's versions leaked onto the Internet, where the album gained a cult following long before its official release.

Brion worked and performed on some of the tracks for Sean Lennon's 2006 album Friendly Fire. Lennon said that working with him was "how I would imagine it's like to work with Prince. It's like having a weird alien prodigy in your room."

Brion has produced recordings by British pop performer Dido, Spoon, and Keane, as well as 2010's False Priest by Of Montreal. Brion also produced Best Coast's second album which was released in early 2012. Brion worked on rapper Mac Miller's album Swimming (2018), and completed production on Miller's posthumous album Circles (2020).

According to Stereogum, Brion's work on Aimee Mann's first solo albums "lay the groundwork for a sound that became synonymous with a strain of notable alternative acts at the turn of the century".

Meaningless
Brion was signed to the Lava/Atlantic label in 1997, but was released from his contract after turning in his solo debut album Meaningless; the album was released independently in 2001.

He is rumored to be working on his second solo full-length album at Abbey Road Studios.

Film scores
Brion is an accomplished film composer, having started scoring by frequently working with director Paul Thomas Anderson, with whom he has a preferential working relationship.  In addition to scoring many of his films, Brion contributed music to Boogie Nights and had a cameo in the film as a moustached guitar player.

Particularly in his film soundtracks, Brion is noted for his use of early analog sampling instruments, particularly the Chamberlin and Optigan, to create near-realistic emulations of certain instruments.

He has earned Best Score Soundtrack Album Grammy nominations for his work on 1999's Magnolia and 2004's Eternal Sunshine of the Spotless Mind.

Brion was hired at the last minute to write the incidental music for The Break-Up. He has also scored and provided original music for I Heart Huckabees, Punch-Drunk Love, Step Brothers (with Chris Thile), ParaNorman, The Future, Synecdoche, New York, Greta Gerwig's Lady Bird and Disney's Christopher Robin (with Geoff Zanelli). He also did live composition for a musical commentary on the Step Brothers DVD.

He also composed the score to the Disney/Pixar short film, The Blue Umbrella, working alongside Sarah Jaffe.

Touring and live performances
Brion is renowned for his regular Friday-night gigs at the Los Angeles club Largo, which feature covers and original songs, a variety of instruments and occasional guest musicians and comedians.  He works without a set list, instead using audience suggestions as a jumping-off point.  He uses a "jigsaw puzzle" approach to performing songs, and uses looping systems to record himself starting often with drums, then adding piano, bass, guitar, and vocals. Recent shows have featured spontaneous appearances with singer-songwriter Jackson Browne, Gillian Welch, vocalists Fiona Apple and Rickie Lee Jones, singing old jazz standards like "My Funny Valentine", with upright bassist Stephen Patt (ex-The Chambers Brothers), percussionist Matt Chamberlain (Tori Amos), bassist Sebastian Steinberg (ex-Soul Coughing), and fiddler Sara Watkins (Nickel Creek).

In April 2006, recurring tendonitis in Brion's right hand forced him to cancel all of his upcoming Largo shows.  As a temporary 'farewell', he played one show only using his left hand, even looping his songs as he normally does and playing the drums with one stick.  He resumed playing at Largo on a regular basis.

Recalling his approach to the Largo shows with Chicago Tribune music editor Lou Carlozo, Brion said: "I taught my hands to follow whatever was coming into my head—and wherever my consciousness would go, I had to push my hands to follow. And at some level, you just had to abandon any concern about how you’d look. Performing without a set list: That was special."

In March 2016, Brion performed his score for Punch-Drunk Love with Wordless Music Orchestra in both Los Angeles and New York City, at the Ace Hotel and the Brooklyn Academy of Music, respectively. Norah Jones provided guest vocals in New York and Joanna Newsom in Los Angeles.

In February 2018, Brion opened for John Mulaney as part of Mulaney's special, Kid Gorgeous. Brion performed during Mulaney's New York City leg of his tour, playing classic rock songs on Radio City's Mighty Wurlitzer pipe organ.

Discography

Solo
 Meaningless (2001)

The Bats
 The Bats – How Pop Can You Get? (1982)

The Grays
 The Grays – Ro Sham Bo (1994)

Film scores
 Hard Eight (with Michael Penn) (1996)
 Magnolia (1999)
 Punch-Drunk Love (2002)
 Eternal Sunshine of the Spotless Mind (2004)
 I Heart Huckabees (2004)
 The Break-Up (2006)
 Synecdoche, New York (2008)
 Step Brothers (2008)
 Glago's Guest (2008)
 The Other Guys (2010)
 Stone (2010) (Main Theme Composer)
 The Future (2011)
 ParaNorman (2012)
 This Is 40 (2012)
 The Blue Umbrella (2013)
 Delivery Man (2013)
 The Gambler (2014)
 Trainwreck (2015)
 John Mulaney: The Comeback Kid (2015)
 Curmudgeons (2016)
 Wilson (2017)
 Lady Bird (2017)
 Sink or Swim (2018)
 Christopher Robin (2018) (with Geoff Zanelli)

Production and guest appearances

References

External links
 Jon Brion Discography
 
 
 Embrionic Press: Jon Brion articles (via the Internet Archive)
 Jon Brion Fan Page

1963 births
American film score composers
American male film score composers
American male singers
Record producers from New Jersey
Songwriters from New Jersey
Eels (band) members
Grammy Award winners
Living people
People from Glen Ridge, New Jersey
'Til Tuesday members